The Deadliest Game is the second book in the young adult series Net Force Explorers created by Tom Clancy and Steve Pieczenik. The book was released in 1998 and ghost written by Diane Duane.

Plot 
Net Force Explorers Megan O'Malley and Leif Anderson work to investigate an online Virtual Reality wargame.

References 

1999 novels
Techno-thriller novels
Novels by Diane Duane
Deadliest game